County Road 362 is a  road in the municipality of Aure.

The road branches off from County Road 680 at the Mjosund Bridge in Giset and runs south along the east coast of the island of Ertvågsøy. It then turns west and runs along the shore above Arasvik Fjord until it terminates in Vågosen at the junction with County Road 682, just before the ferry dock in Arasvika. 

The road is also named Mjosundvegen (Mjosund Road) after the strait that it runs parallel to along its northern stretch. The road is subject to landslides in places.

References

External links
Statens vegvesen – trafikkmeldinger Fv362 (Traffic Information: County Road 362)

362
Aure, Norway